Menemen is a popular traditional Turkish dish which includes eggs,  tomato, green peppers, and spices such as ground black and red pepper cooked in olive oil.

Menemen may be made with onions, but the addition of onions is often debated and is more common when menemen is eaten as a main dish, rather than at breakfast. The dish is similar to shakshouka.

Menemen is commonly eaten for breakfast and served with bread. Its name originates from a small town in Izmir Province.

Preparation
The tomatoes are typically finely diced or may be grated. Grated and diced tomatoes can also be mixed together, depending on the cook's preferred texture. If onions are being used, they may be added to the pan with the green chili peppers and sautéed with heated butter or oil. Aleppo pepper may be added. The addition of onions is often debated and is more common when menemen is not eaten at breakfast but as a main dish. Some Turkish cooks like Saniye Anne insist that a proper menemen can not be made without onions. In 2018, Turkish food critic Vedat Milor launched a Twitter poll to resolve the discussion about onion within menemen. The poll became widely popular, with 437,657 people voting. The onion faction had a narrow victory, with 51% of the vote.

Sucuk, a dried salami-like sausage, can be added to the pan after the peppers have softened. This adds some flavor to the oil; the sucuk can be removed from the pan before the tomatoes are added to avoid overcooking, but this is not necessary. The tomatoes become very soft and the mix not be too watery when the eggs are added. The eggs may be beaten together with salt, pepper and any desired fresh herbs or added directly to the pan. If pastırma is being used, it is added to the pan with the eggs. Kaşar cheese or white cheese may optionally be added on top of the eggs just before they finish cooking, along with a garnish of fresh herbs or scallions. It is usually served in the pan in which it is cooked, a double-handled cooking pan known as sahan, together with fresh bread.

Some variations may include mushrooms or minced lamb. Different spices may be added according to taste including cumin, paprika, mint and thyme.

See also
 Huevos rancheros
 Strapatsada
 List of egg dishes
 Piperade
 Scrambled eggs
 Shakshouka
Mish-mash

References

External links

Egg dishes
Turkish cuisine
Turkish words and phrases
Tomato dishes
Sausage dishes
İzmir
Breakfast dishes